Mohammadabad-e Seyyed (also Romanized as Moḩammadābād-e Seyyed, Moḩammadābād Seyed, and Mohammad Abad Seyyed) is a village in Azizabad Rural District, in the Central District of Narmashir County, Kerman Province, Iran. At the 2006 census, its population was 572, in 146 families.

References 

Populated places in Narmashir County